The Rieti Meeting is an annual athletics event at the Stadio Raul Guidobaldi in Rieti, Italy that takes place in late August or early September. Previously one of the IAAF Grand Prix events, it is now part of the IAAF World Challenge.

It was first organized in 1971 based on an idea by Sandro Giovannelli, today's member of the IAAF Competition Commission.

World records
Over the course of its history, numerous world records have been set at the Rieti Grand Prix.

Meeting records

Men

Women

See also
Golden Gala
Notturna di Milano

References

External links

Rieti All Time Best Performances

Annual track and field meetings
IAAF Grand Prix
IAAF World Challenge
Recurring sporting events established in 1971
Rieti
Athletics competitions in Italy
Sport in Lazio
1971 establishments in Italy
IAAF World Outdoor Meetings